Maks Bajc (7 October 1919, in Ljubljana – 25 September 1983) was a Slovenian actor who acted in Yugoslavian movies during 1955–1983.

External links

References 

1919 births
1983 deaths
20th-century Slovenian male actors
Actors from Ljubljana
Slovenian male film actors
Yugoslav male actors